East Horsley is a village and civil parish in Surrey, England, 21 miles southwest of London, on the A246 between Leatherhead and Guildford. Horsley and Effingham Junction railway stations are on the New Guildford line to London Waterloo.  The two-halves of ancient Horsley are similar in having substantial woodland and some chalky lower slopes, in the south, of the North Downs.

History

Manors
East Horsley appears in Domesday Book of 1086 as having two manors, listed under the chief manor's heading of Horslei. This was held by Lanfranc, Archbishop of Canterbury. Its domesday assets were: 3 hides and 1½ virgates; 8½ ploughs, woodland worth 50 hogs. It rendered £5 per year to its overlords.

The Bishop's Manor in East Horsley seems to have belonged to the see of Exeter throughout the Middle Ages. Malden writing in 1911 associates closely the Domesday entry in Latin meaning 'Bishop Osborn of Exeter holds Woking' with this manor which his successors later held, since there is no trace of any land held by the Bishop of Exeter in Woking in pipe rolls, Assize Rolls, feet of fines or the records of Lambeth Palace.

Enclosure and development
In 1792 an Inclosure Act enabled William Currie MP to inclose most of Horsley Common at the northern end of the parish and the common fields and waste at the southern part, very much on the chalk. The parsonage and glebe were at the same time moved within the parish.

The village is the site of Horsley Towers, a gothic mansion designed by Sir Charles Barry (later the architect of the Houses of Parliament) for William Currie in place of an earlier building.  Currie, a distiller and banker, had bought the property in 1784 and over the next 44 years made extensive changes to the village, including rebuilding most of its houses, establishing the school and restoring the church.

After Currie's death in 1829, the property was acquired by the 1st Earl of Lovelace. It was the marital home of Ada, Lady Lovelace (the writer, mathematician and world's first computer programmer) and later Sir Thomas Sopwith, aviation pioneer.

In 1971 it was used as a (Defence) Staff Training College and was placed in the second category of the English Heritage scheme of architecture as a Grade II* listed building. The buildings were used as a location for the film, The Colour of Magic, in 2008. It is currently in use as a hotel.

William King, 1st Earl of Lovelace (1805-1893) constructed fifteen bridges, known as the Lovelace Bridges, on his estate to facilitate the transport of timber by horse-drawn carts. The bridges were built where the tracks crossed existing bridleways or roads. Ten bridges still exist.

The 3rd Earl of Lovelace imposed restrictive covenants on most of his former fields when selling these to private developers in the early 20th century, leading to the overwhelming proportion of homes being detached; no minimum plot size is specified by these, and planning is controlled by Guildford Borough Council, subject to advice from the civil parish council.

Geography
The settlement is 21 miles southwest of London, partly on the A246 between Leatherhead and Guildford. Horsley and Effingham Junction railway stations are on the New Guildford line in the parish (connected to London Waterloo and both have a line direct to Leatherhead, Epsom and Sutton).

The village has the parade of shops and businesses of the two Horsleys (see West Horsley), Otherwise the two halves of ancient Horsley are similar in having substantial woodland and some chalky lower slopes, in the south, of the North Downs.

Amenities

Shops and businesses
The main row of shops is near the western railway station on a local thoroughfare from the end of Forest Road towards Ockham, a small number of professions operate here, such as accountants, opticians and the NHS medical practice.  A Legacy hotel is in the village.

Christian centre
The medieval church continues as part of a larger charitable organisation in the Diocese of Guildford and caters for Anglicanism, St Martin's.

Theatre
A village with a theatre (as does similarly sized Godstone in the county), this is a well-equipped amateur production stage named the Nomad Theatre which is behind the smaller of East Horsley's two rows of shops, Bishopsmead Parade.  Its construction was largely financed by National Lottery grants from Arts Council England.  The theatre opened in October 1998 with a production of Dylan Thomas's Under Milk Wood.

Demography and housing
East Horsley had 1,343 detached homes (of which 1,309 were inhabited) and fewer than 183 of any other dwelling types at the 2011 census, and a high proportion of business-owners and directors, accordingly it was deemed Britain's "richest village" by The Daily Telegraph in 2011 and again in 2015.

The average level of accommodation in the region composed of detached houses was 28%, the average that was apartments was 22.6%.

The proportion of households in East Horsley who owned their home outright was 19.3% above the regional average.  The proportion who owned their home with a loan was 0.3% greater than the regional average; providing overall a lower proportion than average of rented residential property relative to the average in Surrey, the district and the country.

Politics
Local government is administered by Guildford Borough Council and Surrey County Council.

At Surrey County Council, one of the 81 representatives represents the area within the Horsleys division.

At Guildford Borough Council the ward of the borough is deemed appropriate to be best represented under the current constitution by three councillors.

East Horsley is in Mole Valley.  At the elections since its inception a Conservative has won it.

Neighbouring areas
Neighbouring areas are:

See also
List of places of worship in Guildford (borough)

Notes and references
Notes 

References

Villages in Surrey
Borough of Guildford
Civil parishes in Surrey